Mongolia–Yugoslavia relations were historical foreign relations between Mongolian People's Republic and now split-up Socialist Federal Republic of Yugoslavia. Formal bilateral relations between Mongolia and Yugoslavia were established on 20 November 1956. This was the period of normalization of Yugoslav relations with other Eastern Bloc countries which were either suspended or significantly strained after the 1948 Tito-Stalin split.

During the Cold War period Mongolia closely followed Soviet Union in its policies towards Yugoslavia. During the 1968 Ulan Bator meeting government delegations of the two countries expressed identical views on the situation in Vietnam, condemned aggression and expressed hope for negotiations which will start soon. Yugoslav delegation was led by President of Yugoslavia Josip Broz Tito. Two countries signed agreement on scientific and cultural cooperation in 1985 as well as an agreement on provision of development aid to Mongolia.

Normalization of relations between Soviet Union and Yugoslavia in 1953 after Stalin's death and Belgrade declaration resulted in Vyacheslav Molotov's expellsion from the Presidium after which he was made ambassador to the Mongolian People's Republic.

See also
Yugoslavia and the Non-Aligned Movement
World War II in Yugoslavia
Mongolia in World War II
Mongolia at the 1984 Winter Olympics
Mongol invasion of Europe

References

Mongolia–Yugoslavia relations
Yugoslavia
Mongolia
Mongolia–Serbia relations